General Nichols may refer to:

Francis T. Nicholls (1834–1912), Confederate States Army brigadier general
John F. Nichols (fl. 1970s–2010s), U.S. Air National Guard major general
John J. Nichols (fl. 1990s–2020s), U.S. Air Force major general
Kenneth Nichols (1907–2000), U.S. Army major general
Moses Nichols (1740–1790), New Hampshire Militia brigadier general
Robert L. Nichols (1922–2001), U.S. Marine Corps lieutenant general
William Nicholls (Royal Marines officer) (1854–1935) was a Royal Marines general

See also
Abimael Youngs Nicoll (fl. 1790s–1810s), U.S. Army Adjutant General and acting Inspector General
Edward Nicolls (c. 1779–1865), Royal Marines general
Jasper Nicolls (1778–1849), British Army lieutenant general